The Amiga video connector is a 23-pin male D-subminiature connector fitted to all personal computers in the Amiga range produced by Commodore International from 1985 to 1994, and by Escom from 1995 to 1996. The connector carries signals for analogue and digital RGB, RGB intensity, and genlocking as well as power. Default Amiga screenmodes are directly compatible with TVs in the region in which the computer was sold, so that the user could connect the computer to a common TV if no monitor was available. In the PAL region, the Amiga could be connected directly to the standardized SCART RGB connector on the TV via an adapter cable sold by Commodore, providing superior image quality. Alternatively, Commodore sold an adapter (the A520), that attached to the Amiga video connector and provided composite and RF outputs appropriate to the region in which it was sold. Commodore also sold a range of monitors, which were compatible with the TV signals of the region in which they were sold, and in the PAL region many even had SCART inputs so that not only Amigas, but also other SCART-compatible equipment (such as VCRs) could be attached to them.

While most 1st and 2nd generation Amigas (with the original and the enhanced graphics chipsets) only could output TV compatible screenmodes (15 kHz horizontal refresh rate), the Amiga 3000 also featured a connector for VGA type monitors, providing 30 kHz refresh rate. The 3rd (and last) generation of Amiga computers (with the Advanced Graphics Array chipset) could output a wide range of resolutions and refresh rates, and Commodore introduced a line of multisync monitors to accommodate this. These computers could also output directly to the VGA monitors that by then had become commonplace, provided they were configured to output in a VGA compatible resolution and refresh rate. To enable this, Commodore sold an adapter which, like the A520, attached to the video connector to provide a standard VGA connector.

See also 

 Amiga
 List of video connectors

External links 
 BigBookOfAmigaHardware.com Commodore A520 RF modulator

References 

Amiga
Analog video connectors
Audiovisual connectors
Film and video technology